This article lists the results for the Scotland national football team between 1960 and 1979.

Key

Key to matches
Att. = Match attendance
(H) = Home ground
(A) = Away ground
(N) = Neutral ground

Key to record by opponent
Pld = Games played
W = Games won
D = Games drawn
L = Games lost
GF = Goals for
GA = Goals against

Results
Scotland's score is shown first in each case.

Record by opponent

British Home Championship record by season

Notes

References

External links
RSSSF: Scotland – International Results
Scottish FA: National Team Archive

1960
1959–60 in Scottish football
1960–61 in Scottish football
1961–62 in Scottish football
1962–63 in Scottish football
1963–64 in Scottish football
1964–65 in Scottish football
1965–66 in Scottish football
1966–67 in Scottish football
1967–68 in Scottish football
1968–69 in Scottish football
1969–70 in Scottish football
1970–71 in Scottish football
1971–72 in Scottish football
1972–73 in Scottish football
1973–74 in Scottish football
1974–75 in Scottish football
1975–76 in Scottish football
1976–77 in Scottish football
1977–78 in Scottish football
1978–79 in Scottish football
1979–80 in Scottish football